His Grace Gives Notice is a 1924 British silent comedy film directed by W. P. Kellino and starring Nora Swinburne, Henry Victor and John Stuart. It is an adaptation of the 1922 novel His Grace Gives Notice by Laura Troubridge. A sound adaptation was made in 1933.

Cast
 Nora Swinburne – Cynthia Bannock 
 Henry Victor – George Berwick 
 John Stuart – Joseph Longley 
 Eric Bransby Williams – Ted Burlington 
 Mary Brough – Mrs. Smith 
 Gladys Hamer – Flickers 
 Phyllis Lytton – Mrs. Stapleton 
 Knighton Small – Butler

References

Bibliography
 Low, Rachael. History of the British Film, 1918–1929. George Allen & Unwin, 1971.

External links

1924 films
1924 comedy films
British comedy films
British silent feature films
Films directed by W. P. Kellino
Films based on British novels
Films set in England
Stoll Pictures films
Films shot at Cricklewood Studios
British black-and-white films
1920s English-language films
1920s British films
Silent comedy films